Palos is an impact crater on Mars, located on the southern margin of Amenthes Planum.  Its name was approved in 2000, and refers to a town in Spain.

Tinto Vallis ends in Palos crater, breaching the southwestern rim.  Water flowed through Tinto Vallis and probably pooled in Palos before exiting in the gap in the north rim of the crater.

References 

Impact craters on Mars